Waltzes for Weirdoes is the debut album by English electronic duo Grandadbob. It was released by Southern Fried Records in 2003.

Track listing 

UK Version

 "Monster" – 2:15
 "City Approach" – 4:28
 "Mmmnn" – 3:53
 "Your Mama" – 4:12
 "This Is It" – 5:14
 "Maybe" – 7:05
 "Open Mouthed" – 5:20
 "3am Gherkin" – 6:36
 "Just Show Me" – 3:31
 "Killed By Sweets" – 4:25
 "Kenny" – 3:55
 "Anger Thy Neighbour" – 6:56

References 

2003 debut albums